This is a list of the members of the Dewan Rakyat (House of Representatives) of the First Parliament of the Federation of Malaya (known as the Parliament of Malaysia after 2 November 1963), elected in 1959.

Composition

Elected members by state


Unless noted otherwise, the MPs served the entire term of the parliament (from 11 September 1959 until 1 March 1964).

Perlis

Kedah

Kelantan

Trengganu

Penang

Perak

Pahang

Selangor

Negri Sembilan

Malacca

Johore

Appointed and nominated members by state
Unless noted otherwise, the MPs served from 2 November 1963 until 1 March 1964.

Singapore

Sabah

Sarawak

Notes

References

Abdullah, Z. G., Adnan, H. N., & Lee, K. H. (1997). Malaysia, tokoh dulu dan kini = Malaysian personalities, past and present. Kuala Lumpur, Malaysia: Penerbit Universiti Malaya.
Anzagain Sdn. Bhd. (2004). Almanak keputusan pilihan raya umum: Parlimen & Dewan Undangan Negeri, 1959-1999. Shah Alam, Selangor: Anzagain.
Chin, U.-H. (1996). Chinese politics in Sarawak: A study of the Sarawak United People's Party. Kuala Lumpur: Oxford University Press.
Faisal, S. H. (2012). Domination and Contestation: Muslim Bumiputera Politics in Sarawak. Institute of Southeast Asian Studies.
Hanna, W. A. (1959). Elections in Malaya: A report. New York: American Universities Field Staff. 
Hussain, M. (1987). Membangun demokrasi: Pilihanraya di Malaysia. Kuala Lumpur: Karya Bistari.
Ibnu, H. (1993). PAS kuasai Malaysia?: 1950-2000 sejarah kebangkitan dan masa depan. Kuala Lumpur: GG Edar.
Surohanjaya Pilehanraya Malaysia. (1959). Penyata pilehanraya-pilehanraya umum parlimen (Dewan Ra'ayat) dan dewan-dewan negeri, tahun 1959 bagi negeri-negeri Tanah Melayu. Kuala Lumpur: Jabatan Chetak Kerajaan.

Malaysian parliaments
Lists of members of the Dewan Rakyat